Cereal Killer Cafe is a chain of cafés that serve branded breakfast cereals. The original cafe was located on Brick Lane in Spitalfields, London and was the first cereal-themed café in the United Kingdom. The chain announced the closure of its UK locations on 8 July 2020 as a result of the COVID-19 pandemic. As of 2023, the Dubai cafe remains open and the chain's website continues to offer customers over 100 different types of cereal.

Development
Identical twins Alan and Gary Keery, from Belfast, came up with the idea of selling breakfast cereal after experiencing a morning hangover during a lunch break in Shoreditch and craving a "sugary cereal fix". The brothers were initially dissuaded from pursuing the project but continued after conducting their own market research. Inspired by established cereal cafes in the United States and the premise of the 2007 film Flakes, they went about asking consumers on the streets whether or not they would buy into the concept. They discovered that more than half of the people they had asked would consider visiting their cafe. Funding for the proposal came from a business loan following an unsuccessful £60,000 crowdfunding attempt on Indiegogo. They claimed they found it difficult to rent a location based on their business venture but eventually settled on an old video store.

Business

The two-storey café was situated on Brick Lane, near Shoreditch, and employed eight staff. The interior was designed to reflect a retro style with exposed brickwork, formica furniture and 1980s and '90s music. Among the decor were novelty cereal boxes, vintage milk bottles and other cereal related memorabilia. The cafe offered more than 100 different varieties of global cereal brands, 12 kinds of milk and 20 toppings. It also sold coffee, toast and poptarts.

In 2014 the brothers were challenged by Channel 4 over the price of their bowls of cereal in Tower Hamlets. After being told the London borough had some of the highest rates of poverty in the country, Gary denied this was the case and said his cereal was "cheap for the area" before refusing to continue with the interview.

Media commentary ranged from praise of their entrepreneurship from Boris Johnson to criticism pointing at gentrification around Shoreditch, with the Keery terminating a 2014 interview with Channel Four after reporter Symeon Brown asked "Do you think local people will be able to afford £3.20 cereal?" In response, the brothers wrote an open letter to the broadcaster on Facebook, characterising the reporting as "unfair" and announcing plans to provide provide free breakfasts for underprivileged children.

On an evening in September 2015, anti-gentrification activists threw paint at the building and wrote the word "scum" across it.

By 2017 the brothers had opened cereal cafes in Birmingham, Dubai, Kuwait and Jordan. The London branches of the cafe closed in 2020.

See also

Lisa Mckenzie
List of restaurants in London

References

External links

2014 establishments in England
Buildings and structures in the London Borough of Tower Hamlets
Coffeehouses and cafés in London
Restaurants in London
Breakfast cereals
Spitalfields